Carolina Anna "Lien" Gisolf (13 July 1910 – 30 May 1993) was a Dutch high jumper. She won a silver medal at the 1928 Summer Olympics and finished fourth in 1932.

Her talent was discovered during school competition in 1926, when it turned out that she jumped 30 centimetres higher than her classmates. On 3 July 1928 she set an unofficial Dutch record by jumping 1.465 metres, which was followed by a new world record of 1.582 metres. The same year she became the first Dutch female athlete to win an Olympic medal. She improved her world record twice: to 1.608 metres in 1929 and 1.623 metres in 1932. During the 1930 Women's World Games Gisolf became second. When she had to jump a barrage with her only opponent left, German Inge Braumüller, she tore a muscle, ruining her chances for the first place.

After finishing fourth at the 1932 Summer Olympics Gisolf lost interest in athletics and turned to field hockey.

References

Further reading

 Heere, A. and Kappenburg, B. (2000) 1870 – 2000, 130 jaar atletiek in Nederland Groenevelt b.v. 
 Hemert, W. van (1998) Fosbury-flop de 'klapschaats' van het hoogspringen Atletiek nr. 1: KNAU
 Bijkerk, T. and Paauw, R. (1996) Gouden boek van de Nederlandse Olympiers De Vrieseborch

1910 births
1993 deaths
Dutch female high jumpers
Olympic athletes of the Netherlands
Athletes (track and field) at the 1928 Summer Olympics
Athletes (track and field) at the 1932 Summer Olympics
Olympic silver medalists for the Netherlands
Dutch female field hockey players
People from Bukittinggi
Medalists at the 1928 Summer Olympics
Olympic silver medalists in athletics (track and field)
Women's World Games medalists
20th-century Dutch women